Kami Sherpa, 51, has successfully climbed Everest three times in eight days. Sherpa climbed Everest twice in five days and the third time on the eighth day. Sherpa had  climbed Everest at 10:30 am on May 19, 3:00 pm on May 24 and 4:00 am on May 27. 
 
Sherpa has also claimed that his three climbs in a single season is a world record. He had climbed Everest for the first time in 1997. With three successful climbs this season, he has now scaled Everest 14 times. Sherpa is also the first Vice-Chairman of Everest Climbers' Association. Sherpa was born in Solukhumbu district and resides in Kapan, Kathmandu.

See also
List of Mount Everest summiters by number of times to the summit

References

External links
Nepali mountaineer Kami Rita Sherpa scales Mount Everest for 26th time, beating own world record, The Guardian (8 May 2022)

Nepalese mountain climbers
Sherpa summiters of Mount Everest
Living people
Nepalese Buddhists
People from Solukhumbu District
Nepalese summiters of Mount Everest
Year of birth missing (living people)